Tuleh Sara (also Romanized as Ţūleh Sarā; also known as Ţūl Sarā) is a village in Emamzadeh Abdollah Rural District, Dehferi District, Fereydunkenar County, Mazandaran Province, Iran. At the 2006 census, its population was 294, in 74 families.

References 

Populated places in Fereydunkenar County